Chris Hutchinson may refer to:

 Chris Hutchinson (American football), American football defensive tackle
 Chris Hutchinson (poet) (born 1972), Montreal, Canada